The 1908 Kincardineshire by-election was a parliamentary by-election held for the British House of Commons constituency of Kincardineshire on 25 April 1908. The seat had become vacant when the sitting Liberal Member of Parliament John Crombie died on 22 March 1908.

The election saw the picketing of polling stations by suffragettes protesting at the Liberal government's unwillingness to bring in votes for women.

The Liberal candidate, Arthur Cecil Murray won the seat in a straight fight with his Conservative opponent S J Gammell.

Result

See also 
 List of United Kingdom by-elections (1900–1918)

References

	

Kincardineshire by-election
Kincardineshire by-election
1900s elections in Scotland
By-elections to the Parliament of the United Kingdom in Scottish constituencies
Kincardineshire
Kincardineshire by-election